Heterotilapia buttikoferi, also known as the zebra tilapia, is a West African species of cichlid.

Description
Body is typically yellow or white with black stripes which can vary from very light to near black depending on the mood of the fish. The vertical black bars are broader than the lighter interspaces. Their stripes tend to fade as they age.

Distribution and habitat
This freshwater fish is native to large rivers in tropical West Africa from Guinea-Bissau to Liberia. People have imported and bred them in several other parts the world for aquarium or food purposes.

H. buttikoferi is an alien species in Thailand where it has been introduced for use as an aquarium fish.

Etymology
The specific name honours the Swiss zoologist Johann Büttikofer (1850-1927), the collector of the type.

See also
List of freshwater aquarium fish species

References

External links
 Aquabase
 NCBI

Tilapia
Taxa named by Ambrosius Hubrecht
Fish described in 1881
Taxobox binomials not recognized by IUCN